The 2020 United States House of Representatives elections in Rhode Island was held on November 3, 2020 to elect the two U.S. representatives from the state of Rhode Island, one from each of the state's 2 congressional districts. The elections will coincide with the 2020 U.S. presidential election, as well as other elections to the House of Representatives, elections to the United States Senate and various state and local elections.

Overview

District 1

The 1st district encompasses parts of Providence, as well as eastern Rhode Island, including Aquidneck Island and Pawtucket. The incumbent is Democrat David Cicilline, who was re-elected with 66.7% of the vote in 2018.

Democratic primary

Candidates

Declared 
David Cicilline, incumbent U.S Representative

Primary results

Independents

Candidates

Declared 
 Jeffrey Lemire, perennial candidate
 Frederick Wysocki, financial advisor and candidate for Rhode Island's 1st congressional district in 2018

General election

Predictions

Results

District 2

The 2nd district also takes in parts of Providence, as well as western Rhode Island, including Coventry, Cranston, and Warwick. The incumbent is Democrat James Langevin, who was re-elected with 63.5% of the vote in 2018.

Democratic primary

Candidates

Declared 
Dylan Conley, attorney and chair of the Providence Board of Licenses
Jim Langevin, incumbent U.S Representative

Primary results

Republican primary

Candidates

Declared
Robert Lancia, former state representative
Donald Robbio, electrician and candidate for Rhode Island's 2nd congressional district in 2012

Primary results

General election

Predictions

Results

See also

2020 United States elections
2020 United States Senate election in Rhode Island
2020 United States House of Representatives elections
2020 Rhode Island elections

References

External links
 
 
  (State affiliate of the U.S. League of Women Voters)
 

Official campaign websites for 1st district candidates
 David Cicilline (D) for Congress
 Frederick Wysocki (I) for Congress

Official campaign websites for 2nd district candidates
 Robert Lancia (R) for Congress 
 James Langevin (D) for Congress

2020
Rhode Island
United States House of Representatives